Iproca is a genus of beetles in the family Cerambycidae, containing the following species:

 Iproca acuminata Gressitt, 1940
 Iproca aoyamaorum Hasegawa & Ohbayashi, 2006
 Iproca flavolineata Hayashi, 1971
 Iproca ishigakiana Breuning & Ohbayashi, 1966
 Iproca laosensis Breuning, 1968
 Iproca pedongensis Breuning, 1969

References

Apomecynini
Cerambycidae genera